is a district of Minato, Tokyo, Japan.

Education
Minato City Board of Education operates public elementary and junior high schools.

Minami-Aoyama 1-chōme 1-12 ban, 2-chōme, 3-chōme 1-4-ban, and 4-chōme 1-9 ban are zoned to Aoyama Elementary School (青山小学校).
3-chōme 5-18-ban, 4-chōme 10-28-ban, and 5-7-chōme are zoned to Seinan Elementary School (青南小学校). Areas zoned to Aoyama and Seinan elementaries are zoned to Aoyama Junior High School (青山中学校). 1-chōme 13-26-ban are zoned to Akasaka Elementary School (赤坂小学校) and Akasaka Junior High School (赤坂中学校).

References

Districts of Minato, Tokyo